César Madelón (23 June 1927 – 11 April 2013) was an Argentine equestrian. He competed in two events at the 1960 Summer Olympics.

References

1927 births
2013 deaths
Argentine male equestrians
Olympic equestrians of Argentina
Equestrians at the 1960 Summer Olympics
Sportspeople from Santa Fe Province